Next in Line may refer to:

"Next in Line" (Conway Twitty song)
"Next in Line" (Johnny Cash song)
"Next in Line" (Dead Letter Circus song)
"Next in Line", a song by AfterImage
"Next in Line", a song by Walk the Moon from the album Walk the Moon
"Next in Line", a song by Korn from the album The Serenity of Suffering
Next in Line, the original name of the band The Ordinary Boys
The first in an order of succession